Naomi Beckwith (born 1976) is the deputy director and chief curator of the Solomon R. Guggenheim Museum. She joined the museum in June 2021. Previously she had been the senior curator at the Museum of Contemporary Art, Chicago. Beckwith joined the curatorial staff there in May 2011.

Life and education
A native Chicagoan, Beckwith grew up in Hyde Park and attended Lincoln Park High School, going on to receive a BA in history from Northwestern University in Evanston, Illinois.  She completed an MA with Distinction from the Courtauld Institute of Art in London, presenting her master's thesis on Adrian Piper and Carrie Mae Weems.

Afterward, she was a Helena Rubenstein Critical Studies Fellow at the Whitney Museum Independent Study Program in New York. Beckwith was a fall 2008 grantee of the Andy Warhol Foundation for the Visual Arts and was named the 2011 Leader to Watch by ArtTable.  She serves on the boards of the Laundromat Project (New York) and Res Artis (Amsterdam).

Career
Prior to joining the MCA staff, Beckwith was associate curator at The Studio Museum in Harlem. Preceding her tenure at the Studio Museum, Beckwith was the Whitney Lauder Curatorial Fellow at the Institute of Contemporary Art, Philadelphia, where she worked on numerous exhibitions including Locally Localized Gravity (2007), an exhibition and program of events presented by more than 100 artists whose practices are social, participatory, and communal.

Beckwith has also been the BAMart project coordinator at the Brooklyn Academy of Music and a guest blogger for Art:21. She has curated and co-curated exhibitions at New York alternative spaces Recess Activities, Cuchifritos, and Artists Space. In 2018, she served as curatorial adviser for the biennial SITElines art exhibition in Santa Fe. She has been awarded the 2017 VIA (Visionary Initiatives in Art) Art Fund Curatorial Fellowship and 2017 Center for Curatorial Leadership Fellowship.

Key exhibitions
Beckwith curated the exhibition 30 Seconds off an Inch, which was presented by the Studio Museum in Harlem November 12, 2009 – March 14, 2010. Exhibiting artworks by 42 artists of color or those inspired by black culture from more than 10 countries, the show asked viewers to think about ways in which social meaning is embedded formally within artworks.

Lynette Yiadom-Boakye: Any Number of Preoccupations was on view at the Studio Museum November 11, 2010 – March 13, 2011. The exhibition marked British artist Lynette Yiadom-Boakye’s first solo museum show with 24 canvases on display.

She also co-curated the first major survey of the art of Howardena Pindell at the MCA February 24, 2018 – May 20, 2018.

References

External links
 Museum of Contemporary Art (MCA) Chicago

1976 births
Living people
People from Chicago
Alumni of the Courtauld Institute of Art
Northwestern University alumni
American art curators
American women curators
21st-century American women